Marshall R. Urist (1914 – 2001) was a United States orthopedic surgeon working at University of California, Los Angeles who made discoveries in treating broken bones. He was best known for his discovery in 1965 of bone morphogenic protein.

The Orthopaedic Research Society has given a "Marshall R. Urist Award" every year since 1997.

References

American orthopedic surgeons
David Geffen School of Medicine at UCLA faculty
Bone morphogenetic protein
1914 births
2001 deaths
20th-century surgeons